Unbreak My Heart is an upcoming Philippine romantic drama television series to be broadcast by GMA Network. Directed by Emmanuel Quindo Palo and Dolly Dulu, it stars Gabbi Garcia, Jodi Sta. Maria, Richard Yap and Joshua Garcia. It is set to premiere in 2023 in the network's line up.

Cast and characters
Lead cast
 Jodi Sta. Maria as Camilla
 Richard Yap as Matteo "Matt" Zhang 
 Gabbi Garcia as Madonna
 Joshua Garcia as Lorenzo "Renz" Isidro

Supporting cast
 Eula Valdez
 Laurice Guillen as Elena Tansengco-Zhang
 Nikki Valdez
 Will Ashley
 Bianca de Vera as Gwen Sarmiento
 Maey Bautista
 Sunshine Cruz as Christina Zhang
 Jeremiah Lisbo
 Victor Neri
Gardo Versoza
 Dionne Monsanto
 PJ Endrinal
 Mark Rivera

Production

Development
In December 2022, executives of GMA Network and ABS-CBN were in discussions for a collaboration of a television series, with both companies casting their respective artists and the latter's production unit Dreamscape Entertainment developing the series.

Filming
Principal photography commenced in January 2023, with additional filming to be held in Switzerland.

References

External links
 

Filipino-language television shows
GMA Network drama series
Philippine romance television series
Television shows set in Switzerland
Upcoming television series